Michael Bandy (born December 5, 1997) is an American football wide receiver for the Los Angeles Chargers of the National Football League (NFL). He played college football at San Diego.He played High School Football at Servite High School.

College career
Bandy was a member of the San Diego Toreros for four seasons. He finished his career with 192 receptions for 3,294 receiving yards and 28 receiving touchdowns.

Professional career
Bandy initially played in The Spring League after going unselected in the 2020 NFL Draft. Bandy signed with the Los Angeles Chargers on June 18, 2021. He was waived on August 16, 2021, but was re-signed four days later. Bandy was waived again on August 31, 2021, during final roster cuts and was re-signed to the practice squad the next day. He was elevated to the active roster on December 26, 2021, for the team's Week 16 game against the Houston Texans and made his NFL debut in the game. He signed a reserve/future contract with the Chargers on January 11, 2022.

On August 30, 2022, Bandy was waived by the Chargers and signed to the practice squad the next day. He was promoted to the active roster on October 22.

References

External links
San Diego Toreros bio
Los Angeles Chargers bio

Living people
People from La Mirada, California
Players of American football from California
American football wide receivers
San Diego Toreros football players
Sportspeople from Los Angeles County, California
Los Angeles Chargers players
1997 births